Andres Molinary (1847–1915) was an artist, art teacher, restorer and photographer who painted for most of his career in New Orleans, Louisiana.  His works were prominently displayed in New Orleans during his career, with exhibitions at the Southern Art Union, the World's Industrial and Cotton Centennial Exposition, and the Artists' Association of New Orleans.  At the time of his death, the Delgado Museum of Art sponsored a retrospective exhibition of his works.

Early life and training
Molinary was born in Gibraltar and studied art at institutes in Spain, various regions in Africa, and Italy.  During this period, he was influenced by Spanish artist Marià Fortuny especially with respect to painting landscapes and historic vistas.  He followed his family to New Orleans in 1872 to pursue an engineering career.  After further study of art in Central America, he started his professional career as an artist in New Orleans in 1876.

Artistic career
Molinary's subjects included landscapes, genre scenes, and portraits of prominent people.  He was considered a member of the Seebold School of artists in New Orleans.  He mentored other artists through his involvement with the Artists Association of New Orleans.

Shortly before his death, he married fellow artist and artistic protégé Marie Madeleine Seebold.

References

External links
Examples of Molinary's paintings can be viewed on-line, courtesy of the KnowLA Encyclopedia of Louisiana.

19th-century American painters
American male painters
20th-century American painters
Artists from New Orleans
1847 births
1915 deaths
Gibraltarian emigrants to the United States
19th-century American male artists
20th-century American male artists